Funny River is a census-designated place (CDP) in Kenai Peninsula Borough, Alaska, United States. At the 2010 census the population was 877, up from 636 in 2000.

It is best known for the Funny River Fire in May 2014.

Geography

Funny River is located on the northwestern side of the Kenai Peninsula at  (60.493952, -150.781743). It is bordered to the west by Soldotna and to the north by the Kenai River, across which is the CDP of Sterling. Road access to the community is only from Soldotna, as there are no bridges across the Kenai River between Funny River and Sterling. Browns Lake is in the eastern part of the CDP.

Demographics

Funny River first appeared on the 2000 U.S. Census as a census-designated place (CDP).

As of the census of 2010, there were 877 people, 278 households, and 182 families residing in the CDP.  The population density was 23.4 people per square mile (9.0/km2).  There were 621 housing units at an average density of 22.8/sq mi (8.8/km2).  The racial makeup of the CDP was 93.71% White, 1.73% Native American, 1.10% Asian, 1.42% from other races, and 2.04% from two or more races.  0.47% of the population were Hispanic or Latino of any race.

There were 278 households, out of which 22.3% had children under the age of 18 living with them, 57.9% were married couples living together, 3.6% had a female householder with no husband present, and 34.5% were non-families. 25.9% of all households were made up of individuals, and 4.7% had someone living alone who was 65 years of age or older.  The average household size was 2.29 and the average family size was 2.80.

In the CDP, the population was spread out, with 20.1% under the age of 18, 3.8% from 18 to 24, 25.9% from 25 to 44, 38.7% from 45 to 64, and 11.5% who were 65 years of age or older.  The median age was 45 years. For every 100 females, there were 114.9 males.  For every 100 females age 18 and over, there were 119.9 males.

The median income for a household in the CDP was $43,047, and the median income for a family was $51,518. Males had a median income of $29,821 versus $21,875 for females. The per capita income for the CDP was $22,648.  About 3.2% of families and 3.5% of the population were below the poverty line, including 5.9% of those under age 18 and none of those age 65 or over.

References

Census-designated places in Kenai Peninsula Borough, Alaska
Census-designated places in Alaska